Gordon Stephenson House is an office building within the one40william commercial development in Perth, Western Australia. The building was named in honour of Gordon Stephenson, an architect responsible for planning much of modern Perth's urban form through the 1955 Plan for the Metropolitan Region, Perth and Fremantle. It currently houses the Departments of Planning, Lands and Heritage, Transport and Mines, Industry Regulation and Safety among others.

Architecture
The site is located over an underground platform of the Perth railway station known as Perth Underground. The building includes an entrance to the railway station.

The building has won a number of Western Australian design awards and the 2012 International Architecture Award.

Construction
Construction began in 2007 and was completed in mid-2010. Construction on the building was delayed while the railway construction was completed.

References

Office buildings in Perth, Western Australia
William Street, Perth
Office buildings completed in 2010